Lawtey is a city in Bradford County, Florida, United States. The population was 730 at the 2010 census, up from 656 in 2000.

The city has received national attention and earned the dubious distinction of being one of only two official speed traps designated by the American Automobile Association (the other being Waldo a few miles to the south). However, the label was removed by AAA in August 2018 after reforms by current police chief Shane Bennett.

Geography

Demographics

As of the census of 2000, there were 656 people, 259 households, and 182 families residing in the city. The racial makeup of the city was 64.79% White, 32.16% African American, 1.22% Native American, 0.46% from other races, and 1.37% from two or more races. Hispanic or Latino of any race were 1.68% of the population.

There were 259 households, out of which 34.0% had children under the age of 18 living with them, 46.7% were married couples living together, 16.2% had a female householder with no husband present, and 29.7% were non-families. 26.3% of all households were made up of individuals, and 11.2% had someone living alone who was 65 years of age or older.  The average household size was 2.53 and the average family size was 3.04.

In the city, the population was spread out, with 27.0% under the age of 18, 8.4% from 18 to 24, 28.7% from 25 to 44, 21.0% from 45 to 64, and 14.9% who were 65 years of age or older.  The median age was 36 years. For every 100 females, there were 100.0 males.  For every 100 females age 18 and over, there were 95.5 males.

The median income for a household in the city was $23,875, and the median income for a family was $27,375. The per capita income for the city was $14,122.  About 21.2% of families and 22.8% of the population were below the poverty line, including 26.0% of those under age 18 and 20.9% of those age 65 or over.

References 

Cities in Bradford County, Florida
Cities in Florida